Tyrese Dyce (born 19 April 2001) is an English professional footballer who plays as a defender for Spennymoor Town, on loan from Sunderland.

Club career
Dyce came through the academy programme at West Brom, playing twice in the EFL Trophy during the 2020-21 season for West Brom U23s against the senior teams of Swindon Town and Exeter City, scoring in the game against Swindon. He was released by West Brom in the summer of 2021 and signed for Sunderland on a free transfer, joining the Sunderland U23s group. He made his senior professional debut on 10 October 2021 in an EFL Trophy game against Manchester United U23s, scoring a debut goal in a 2–1 win.

On 24 March 2022, Dyce joined National League North side Spennymoor Town on loan for the remainder of the 2021–22 season.

Playing style
Dyce plays primarily as a left back, although is able to play full back, centre back or as a winger playing on either side of the field.

References

External links

2001 births
Living people
English footballers
Sunderland A.F.C. players
Spennymoor Town F.C. players
Association football defenders
West Bromwich Albion F.C. players
National League (English football) players